Jane Wanjiku Gakunyi (born 14 June 1979) is a Kenyan long-distance runner.

At the 2003 World Cross Country Championships she finished third in the short race, while the Kenyan team, of which Wanjiku was a part, won the team competition. She finished ninth at the 2004 World Cross Country Championships, but this was not enough to win a medal with the team.

She is not to be confused with Jane Wanjiku Ngotho, a Kenyan runner and world junior champion from 1988.

Personal bests
1500 metres - 4:15.01 min (2005)
3000 metres - 8:45.97 min (2006)
5000 metres - 15:04.00 min (2003)
10,000 metres - 31:04.34 min (2004)
Half marathon - 1:10:03 hrs (2006)

External links

1979 births
Living people
Kenyan female long-distance runners
Athletes (track and field) at the 2004 Summer Olympics
Olympic athletes of Kenya
Kenyan female cross country runners